One Life is an upcoming biographical film of British humanitarian Nicholas Winton, starring Anthony Hopkins and Johnny Flynn as Winton, who due to his actions has been called “the British Oskar Schindler”.

Synopsis
A British stockbroker visits Czechoslovakia in the 1930s and forms plans to assist in the rescue of Jewish children before the onset of WWII, in an operation that came to be known as Kindertransport.

Cast
  Anthony Hopkins as Nicholas  Winton
 Johnny Flynn as younger Nicholas Winton
 Helena Bonham Carter as Babi Winton 
 Lena Olin as Grete Winton
 Jonathan Pryce as Martin Blake
 Ziggy Heath as younger Martin Blake
 Romola Garai as Doreen Wariner
 Alex Sharp as Trevor Chadwick
 Samantha Spiro as Esther Rantzen

Production

In September 2020 Anthony Hopkins and Johnny Flynn were announced  as being attached to a bio-pic about Nicholas Winton called One Life. From a Lucinda Coxon and Nick Drake screenplay, Aisling Walsh was set to direct with See-Saw Films and BBC Films producing through executive producers Rose Garnett and Simon Gillis, and producers Iain Canning, Emile Sherman, and Joanna Laurie. FilmNation Entertainment and Cross City Films were to be managing international sales. In September 2022 it was revealed that James Hawes was attached to direct his feature film debut whilst Helena Bonham Carter had joined the cast as Winton’s mother, Babi Winton. It was also revealed that Guy Heeley was on board as producer and that the screenplay was based on the book If It’s Not Impossible…The Life of Sir Nicholas Winton, written by his daughter Barbara Winton. Also announced as joining  the cast were Jonathan Pryce, Romola Garai and Alex Sharp. Filming took place in London in September 2022, with principal photography also taking place in Prague.

References

External links

Upcoming films
2020s biographical drama films
2020s historical films
2020s war drama films
2020s English-language films
 2020s British films
British biographical drama films
British war drama films
Drama films based on actual events
Films about Jews and Judaism
Films set in the 1930s
Films shot in London
Films shot in Prague
World War II films based on actual events
Rescue of Jews during the Holocaust